The 2017–18 Fordham Rams men's basketball team represented Fordham University during the 2017–18 NCAA Division I men's basketball season. The Rams, led by third-year head coach Jeff Neubauer, played their home games at Rose Hill Gymnasium in The Bronx, New York as a member of the Atlantic 10 Conference. They finished the season 9–22, 4–14 in A-10 play to finish in last place. They lost in the first round of the A-10 tournament to George Washington.

Previous season
The Rams finished the 2016–17 season 13–19, 7–11 in A-10 play to finish in 10th place. In the A-10 tournament,  they lost in the second round to George Mason.

Offseason

Departures

Incoming transfers

2017 recruiting class

Preseason 
In a poll of the league's head coaches and select media members at the conference's media day, the Rams were picked to finish in 13th place in the A-10. Junior guard Joseph Chartouny was named to the conference's preseason third team.

Roster

Schedule and results

|-
!colspan=9 style=| Exhibition

|-
!colspan=9 style=| Non-conference regular season

|-
!colspan=9 style=| Atlantic 10 regular season

|-
!colspan=9 style=| Atlantic 10 tournament

Source

See also
 2017–18 Fordham Rams women's basketball team

References

Fordham
Fordham Rams men's basketball seasons
Fordham
Fordham